Château-Landon is a commune in the Seine-et-Marne department in the Île-de-France region in north-central France. The commune contains within it the Souppes-sur-Loing quarry, where the bright white travertine stones for construction of the Sacré-Cœur, Paris, were sourced. Formerly the seat of the canton of Château-Landon, it has been part of the canton of Nemours since 2015.

Demographics
The inhabitants are called Chatellandonnais or Castellandonnais.

See also
Communes of the Seine-et-Marne department

References

External links

1999 Land Use, from IAURIF (Institute for Urban Planning and Development of the Paris-Île-de-France région) 
 

Communes of Seine-et-Marne